Marguerite Beaugé (23 October 1892 – 6 April 1977) was a French film editor. Beaugé died in April 1977. Her daughter, Yvonne Martin, was also a renowned film editor.

Selected filmography
 Napoléon (1927)
 Levy and Company (1930)
 The Mystery of the Yellow Room (1930)
 The Unknown Singer (1931)
 The Levy Department Stores (1932)
 Sailor's Song (1932)
 The Abbot Constantine (1933)
 Second Bureau (1935)
 White Cargo (1937)
 Pépé le Moko (1937)
 Beethoven's Great Love (1937)
 Lights of Paris (1938)
 Return at Dawn (1938)
 Sacred Woods (1939)
 Immediate Call (1939)
 Radio Surprises (1940)
 Pierre and Jean (1943)
 The Murderer Is Not Guilty (1946)
 The Dancer of Marrakesh (1949)
 The Ladies in the Green Hats (1949)
 They Were Five (1952)
 The Blonde Gypsy (1953)
 It's All Adam's Fault (1958)

References

Bibliography 
 Capua, Michelangelo. Anatole Litvak: The Life and Films. McFarland, 2015.

External links 
 

1892 births
1977 deaths
French film editors
French women film editors